"Words and Music" is the first single released by Andy Gibb, reaching number 78 in Australia and number 29 in New Zealand.

This single was never issued on LP or CD. This single and its B-side "Westfield Mansions" was released in Australia as a double A-side. Gibb performed this song on Countdown on September 7, 1975.

Recording
The song was produced by Col Joye, who also produced the Bee Gees' first singles in Australia.

On the 1975 recording, Gibb played guitar. The song was arranged by Billy Weston and engineered by Ron Patton.

Gibb re-recorded this song in 1976 for his album Flowing Rivers released in 1977. It was later released as a B-side of "(Love Is) Thicker Than Water". The 1976 version was produced by Albhy Galuten and Karl Richardson.

Personnel
Andy Gibb — vocals, rhythm guitar
Billy Weston — arrangement
Ron Patton — engineer

Chart performance

References

1975 debut singles
Songs written by Andy Gibb
Andy Gibb songs
1975 songs
Songs about music